Henry Pickford (1820 – date of death unknown) was an English first-class cricketer.

Pickford was born at Cheadle, Cheshire. He made his debut in first-class cricket for Manchester against Yorkshire at Manchester. He played in first-class matches for Manchester on nine occasions between 1844 and 1857, including on two occasions when the matches were billed as Lancashire v Yorkshire in 1849. He also played two first-class matches for the North in the North v South fixtures of 1847 and 1848. Across eleven first-class matches, Pickford scored 139 runs at an average of 6.61, with a high score of 27.

References

External links

1820 births
Date of death unknown
People from Cheadle, Greater Manchester
English cricketers
Manchester Cricket Club cricketers
North v South cricketers
Lancashire cricketers